Ratthapark Wilairot (Feem) ( (Born April 14, 1988), is a Thai professional motorcycle road racer. Wilairot first competed in Grand Prix racing during the 2006 season's Japanese Grand Prix, and finished a respectable 10th after qualifying in 14th place. In 2006 he was runner-up in the challenging Japanese national championship. He joined the 250cc World Championship in 2007 as a member of the Thai Honda PTT-SAG team. His best finish came at the 2010 Dutch TT where he finished 4th, narrowly missing out on the podium.

Motorcycle racing career
Born April 14, 1988 in Chonburi Province, Thailand, Wilairot is the eldest son of Thai veteran racer Christmas Wilairot. He began junior road racing at 5 years old and first won a 50cc motocross trophy at the age of ten. Ratthapark has a younger brother Ratthapong Wilairot (Float, born 1993) who is competing in the Asia Road Racing Championship SS600 class and the Supersport World Championship.

Wilairot currently competes in the Moto2 World Championship, with a best result of fourth at the 2010 Dutch TT. Wilairot had qualified on the front row for the first time, and challenged for the lead with eventual race winner Andrea Iannone. Title challengers Toni Elías and Thomas Lüthi later demoted Wilairot to just off the podium. On 31 July 2013, Wilairot took a sabbatical from racing professionally and became a rider coach for his replacement in the Thai Honda PTT Gresini Moto2 team, Thitipong Warokorn.

On 27 December 2013, Wilairot announced an end to his sabbatical by signing with PTR for the 2014 Supersport World Championship season. He will ride a Honda CBR600RR and be sponsored by Core.

Career statistics

Grand Prix motorcycle racing

By season

Races by year
(key)

Supersport World Championship

Races by year
(key) (Races in bold indicate pole position; races in italics indicate fastest lap)

References

External links

 

Ratthapark Wilairot
250cc World Championship riders
1988 births
Living people
Moto2 World Championship riders
Supersport World Championship riders
Ratthapark Wilairot
Ratthapark Wilairot